From St. Louie to Frisco is the twelfth studio album by Chuck Berry, released in 1968 by Mercury Records. One track on the album, "My Tambourine", is the same tune as Berry's later hit for Chess Records, "My Ding-a-Ling", but with less risque lyrics. The Sir Douglas Quintet backed Berry on parts of this album.

Track listing
All songs written and arranged by Chuck Berry, except where noted.
"Louie to Frisco" – 2:20
"Ma Dear" – 2:15
"The Love I Lost" – 3:03
"I Love Her, I Love Her" – 5:55
"Little Fox" – 2:58
"Rock Cradle Rock" – 1:23
"Soul Rockin'" – 2:47
"I Can't Believe" – 2:43
"Misery" – 2:30
"My Tambourine" (Dave Bartholomew-Chuck Berry) – 2:17
"Oh Captain" – 2:25
"Mum's the Word" – 1:33

Personnel
 Chuck Berry – guitar, vocals
 Doug Sahm – guitar
 Quincy Macon – guitar
 Augie Meyers – keyboards
 Johnnie Johnson, – piano
 Harvey Kagan – bass guitar
 Forrest Frierson – bass guitar
 Ebbie Hardy – drums
 George Rains – drums
 Eugene Washington – drums
 Frank Morin – saxophone
 Carey Enlow – tenor saxophone
 Martin Fierto – trumpet
 Ingrid Berry – backing vocals

References

External links

Chuck Berry albums
1968 albums
Mercury Records albums
Albums produced by Chuck Berry